The Dangerous Flirt (also released as A Dangerous Flirtation) is a 1924 American melodrama directed by Tod Browning and starring Evelyn Brent and Edward Earle.

Plot
As described in a review in a film magazine, Sheila Fairfax (Brent), reared by a puritanical aunt, is stupidly old-fashioned. Captain Ramon Jose (Gendron) inveigles her into becoming engaged to him but she breaks it. Dick Morris (Earle), a mining engineer, gallantly whisks her away and they are married. Sheila’s puritanical training makes her an easy prey to fears on her wedding night. Dick misunderstands her timidity for disgust and leaves her. She follows him to South America and they become the guests of Don Alfonso, uncle of Ramon Jose. The Don and Jose vie for her regard and in a fight Jose is killed by his uncle. Dick faces a firing squad under the Don’s orders but Sheila saves him by a ruse and they escape, happily reunited.

Cast
 Evelyn Brent as Sheila Fairfax
 Edward Earle as Dick Morris
 Sheldon Lewis as Don Alfonso
 Clarissa Selwynne as Aunt Prissy
 Pierre Gendron as Captain Jose Gonzales

Preservation
With no prints of The Dangerous Flirt located in any film archives, it is a lost film.

See also
List of lost films

References

External links

1924 films
1924 lost films
1924 romantic drama films
American romantic drama films
American silent feature films
American black-and-white films
Films directed by Tod Browning
Film Booking Offices of America films
Lost American films
Lost romantic drama films
Melodrama films
1920s American films
Silent romantic drama films
Silent American drama films
Films with screenplays by Richard Schayer